This is a list of formal systems, also known as logical calculi.

Mathematical

 Domain relational calculus, a calculus for the relational data model
 Functional calculus, a way to apply various types of functions to operators
 Join calculus, a theoretical model for distributed programming
 Lambda calculus, a formulation of the theory of reflexive functions that has deep connections to computational theory
 Matrix calculus, a specialized notation for multivariable calculus over spaces of matrices
 Modal μ-calculus, a common temporal logic used by formal verification methods such as model checking
 Pi-calculus, a formulation of the theory of concurrent, communicating processes that was invented by Robin Milner
 Predicate calculus, specifies the rules of inference governing the logic of predicates
 Propositional calculus, specifies the rules of inference governing the logic of propositions
 Refinement calculus, a way of refining models of programs into efficient programs
 Rho calculus, introduced as a general means to uniformly integrate rewriting and lambda calculus
 Tuple calculus, a calculus for the relational data model, inspired the SQL language
 Umbral calculus, the combinatorics of certain operations on polynomials
 Vector calculus (also called vector analysis), comprising specialized notations for multivariable analysis of vectors in an inner-product space

Other formal systems

See also

 

 
Formal systems